The 2006 United States House of Representatives election in Montana was held on November 7, 2006 to determine who will represent the state of Montana in the United States House of Representatives. Montana has one, at large district in the House, apportioned according to the 2000 United States Census, due to its low population. Representatives are elected for two-year terms.

Democratic primary

Candidates
Monica Lindeen, Montana State Representative
Eric Jon Gunderson

Results

Republican primary

Candidates
Denny Rehberg, incumbent U.S. Congressman

Results

General election

Results

References

 CNN
 Washington Post

2006 Montana elections
Montana
2006